Kaljo-Feliks Raag (3 June 1892 – 10 April 1967) was an Estonian heavyweight weightlifter who won a bronze medal at the 1922 World Championships and placed seventh at the 1924 Summer Olympics. He won the national heavyweight title in 1925 and 1927 and set six national records.

After retiring from competitions Raag acted as a weightlifting coach, referee and official. Besides wrestling he was known as a singer and theater actor. He performed as an actor at the Valga theatre from 1919 until 1922 and as a choral singer and soloist at the Estonia Theatre from 1928 until 1933. He appeared in two Estonian silent films: Õnnelik korterikriisi lahendus (1924), directed by Konstantin Märska, and Tšeka komissar Miroštšenko (1925), directed by Paul Sehnert.

References

External links
 

1892 births
1967 deaths
People from Võru Parish
People from the Governorate of Livonia
Olympic weightlifters of Estonia
Weightlifters at the 1924 Summer Olympics
Estonian male weightlifters
Estonian male stage actors
Estonian male film actors
Estonian male silent film actors
Estonian male musical theatre actors
20th-century Estonian male singers
20th-century Estonian male actors
World Weightlifting Championships medalists